Mike Conley may refer to:

Mike Conley (boxer) (1860–1920), American boxer
Mike Conley Sr. (born 1962), American track and field athlete
Mike Conley Jr. (born 1987), American basketball player and son of Mike Conley Sr.

See also
Mike Connolly (disambiguation)